Leo Dickens (16 March 1927 – 21 February 2019) was an English footballer who played as a full back in the Football League for Chester. He later worked as a railway worker. Dickens died in South Kirkby, Wakefield in February 2019 at the age of 81 after suffering from Alzheimer's disease.

References

1927 births
2019 deaths
Association football fullbacks
Chester City F.C. players
English Football League players
English footballers
People from Hemsworth
Rotherham United F.C. players